Naan Mahaan Alla may refer to two Tamil language films:

 Naan Mahaan Alla (1984 film), a 1984 film starring Rajinikanth
 Naan Mahaan Alla (2010 film), a 2010 film starring Karthik Sivakumar and Kajal Aggarwal